TiktoClock is a Philippine television variety show broadcast by GMA Network. Hosted by Kim Atienza, Pokwang, and Rabiya Mateo, it premiered on July 25, 2022 on the network's afternoon line up.

The show is streaming online on Facebook and YouTube.

Hosts

 Kim Atienza
 Pokwang
 Rabiya Mateo

Recurring co-hosts
 Rhian Ramos 
Boobay 
 Jayson Gainza 
 Faith da Silva

Segments 
 Taympers
 Oras Mo Na!
 Hale-Hale Hoy!
 Dance Raffle
 Mamang-huhula
 Quiz and Shout
 Category Game/TiktoKulitan
 Boy Romantiko

Ratings 
According to AGB Nielsen Philippines' Nationwide Urban Television Audience Measurement People in Television Homes, the pilot episode of TiktoClock earned a 4.2% rating.

References

External links
 
 

2022 Philippine television series debuts
Television shows set in the Philippines
Filipino-language television shows
GMA Network original programming
Philippine variety television shows